Bogdan Karaičić (born 31 July 1984) is a Serbian professional basketball coach who is currently an assistant coach for Partizan Belgrade of the Serbian KLS, the Adriatic League and the EuroLeague, as well as a scout for the Serbian national team.

Coaching career 
Bogdan Karaičić started his coaching career back in 2004 in Hungary where he worked as a youth coach in several clubs. He was one of the founder of Szentendrei Kosárlabda SE. During his youth coaching Karaičić won several medals in youth competitions. Karaičić joined the Danish club Hørsholm 79ers in 2009 and first served as a coach in their youth system. With U18 team Karaičić won 2nd place in Danish League and in international Scania Cup which is internatinaol basketball chamipnship for all youth teams from Nordic countries.  In the 2010–11 season, he was assistant coach of the club's men's team in the Danish League. In the 2011–12 season, he was named Hørsholm head coach. In his first season as a head coach Karaičić was leading the Hørsholm 79ers to the Danish Cup final where the team lost to Bakken Bears.

On 9 December 2013, he was named a head coach of Team FOG Næstved of the Danish League. Karaičić won two bronze medals with Team FOG Næstved before he decided to leave the club.

In August 2018, Karaičić was named as an assistant coach for Lokomotiv Kuban of the Russian VTB United League, where season before he worked as a scout. On 15 November 2019, Karaičić was appointed as an interim head coach, leading team in 5 season games. 

On 10 June 2020, head coach Saša Obradović added Karaičić to the Crvena zvezda coaching staff as an assistant. Karaičić left the Zvezda following the departure of coach Obradović in December 2020.

In May 2021, Karaičić was named an assistant coach for Mega Soccerbet under Vlada Jovanović. He helped the team to reach Serbian Super League Finals where they lost to Crvena zvezda. Anyhow reaching the Finals was one of the historic result of Mega since it was first time in the club history that they played Serbian League finals. 

In August 2021, he was named an assistant coach for Partizan under Željko Obradović.

National teams 
Karaičić was an assistant coach of the U20 Denmark team at the 2011 FIBA U20 European Championship Division B in Sarajevo, Bosnia and Herzegovina. He was an assistant coach of the U18 Denmark team at the 2012 FIBA Europe Under-18 Championship in Lithuania and Latvia, which got relegated to the Division B.

Karaičić was the head coach of the U18 Denmark team at the 2013 FIBA Europe Under-18 Championship Division B in Macedonia and 2014 FIBA Europe Under-18 Championship Division B in Bulgaria. He finished his stint as the U18 Denmark head coach with a 8–8 record at two U18 Division B Championships.

In January 2020, coach Igor Kokoškov added Karaičić to the Serbia national team staff as a scout.

Career achievements  
As assistant coach
 Russian Cup winner: 1 (with Lokomotiv Kuban: 2018)

References

External links
 
 EuroLeague Profile
 Profile at eurobasket.com

1984 births
Living people
KK Crvena zvezda assistant coaches
PBC Lokomotiv-Kuban coaches
Serbian expatriate basketball people in Denmark
Serbian expatriate basketball people in Hungary
Serbian expatriate basketball people in Russia
Serbian men's basketball coaches
Serbian men's basketball players
Serbian basketball scouts
Sportspeople from Užice